This is a list of members of the Northern Territory Legislative Assembly from 1980 to 1983.

 Labor member Neville Perkins resigned on 6 March 1981; Labor candidate Neil Bell won the resulting by-election on 28 August 1981.
 Labor member Jon Isaacs resigned on 2 November 1981; Labor candidate Terry Smith won the resulting by-election on 21 November 1981.

See also
1980 Northern Territory general election

Members of Northern Territory parliaments by term
20th-century Australian politicians